K. S. Premkumar (1 June 1955 – 3 December 2022), better known by his stage name Kochu Preman, was an Indian actor who worked in Malayalam film industry. He acted in more than 250 films, mainly in supporting and comedy roles, and also appeared in television.

Early life and career
Kochu Preman was born K. S. Premkumar on 1 June 1955 to Kalaramathil Shivaraman Shasthri and T. S. Kamalam at Peyad in Thiruvananthapuram, India. He has six siblings. Preman had his primary education from Government school, Peyad. He completed college education from Mahatma Gandhi College, Thiruvananthapuram. He has worked in drama troupes such as Kalidasa Kalakendram, Kerala Theaters, and Sanghachethana. In 1996, he debuted in the Malayalam film Dilliwala Rajakumaran. He adapted the stage name Kochu Preman because he believed that the name suits his short stature.

Personal life and death
Preman married cine-serial actress Girija Preman in 1984. They had a son named P. G. Harikrishnan.

Preman died on 3 December 2022, at the age of 67 in Thiruvananthapuram. He was suffering from lung related issues prior to his death.

Filmography

Television

 Cinemala (Asianet)
 Calling bell (Surya TV)
 Chakkarabharani (Surya TV)
 Chila kudumba chitrangal (Kairali TV)
 Culcutta hospital (Surya TV)
 Devimahathmyam (Asianet)
 Dream City (Surya TV)
 Jwalayayi (DD Malayalam)
 Kadamattathu Kathanar (Asianet)
 Kaliveedu (Surya TV)
 Kanthari
 Koodevide (Asianet)
 Kunnankulathangaadi (Media One)
 Laughing Villa (Surya TV)
 Life is beautiful (Asianet)
 Life is Beautiful Season 2 (Asianet)
 Moonumani (Flowers (TV channel))
 Mr & Mrs Comedy (YouTube)
 Mrs. Hitler (Zee Keralam)
Ningalude Swantham Chanthu (DD Malayalam) Double Role
 Prekshakare Avashyamunde (Mazhavil Manorama)
 Rahasya Sancharangal (Asianet Plus)
 Shivakami (Surya TV)
 Sneham (Surya TV)
 Sreemahabhagavatham (Asianet)
 Swami Ayyappan (Asianet)
 Thatteem Mutteem (Mazhavil Manorama)
 Urulakku Upperi (Amrita TV)

References

External links
Kochupreman profile

Kochu Preman at MSI

Kochu Preman at PBM

1955 births
2022 deaths
20th-century Indian male actors
21st-century Indian male actors
Indian male film actors
Male actors from Thiruvananthapuram
Male actors in Malayalam cinema
Male actors in Malayalam television
Indian male television actors